"What Do I Do Now?" is a 1995 song by English Britpop band Sleeper, written by the band's vocalist and guitarist Louise Wener. It was the first single to be released from their second album The It Girl which followed in May 1996.

"What Do I Do Now" was covered by Elvis Costello for the 1997 compilation album Volume Seventeen (and later on the expanded edition of his 2001 album All This Useless Beauty. Sleeper reciprocated by covering "The Other End of the Telescope", which appeared on the b-side of "Statuesque".

Track listings

UK cassette single Indolent SLEEP 009MC

"What Do I Do Now?" – 3:41
"Paint Me"– 3:25

UK 7-inch single Indolent SLEEP 009
UK CD1 Indolent SLEEP 009CD1

"What Do I Do Now?" – 3:41
"Paint Me"– 3:25
"Room at the Top"– 3:07

UK CD2 Indolent SLEEP 009CD2

"What Do I Do Now?" – 3:41
"Disco Duncan (live)"– 4:09
"Vegas (live)"– 3:14
"Amuse (live)"– 2:32

Charts

References

External links
"What Do I Do Now?" music video
Sleeper @ BBC Music
Sleeper release discography @ We Heart Music

1995 singles
Elvis Costello songs
Sleeper (band) songs
Songs written by Louise Wener
Song recordings produced by Stephen Street
1995 songs
Music videos directed by Lindy Heymann